Patrick O'Leary (Saginaw, Michigan, September 13, 1952) is an American science fiction and  fantasy author and ad copy writer.

Life and work
O'Leary's literary works have been recognized and highlighted at Michigan State University in their Michigan Writers Series. He wrote the poem "Nobody Knows It But Me" which was used in the popular 2002 advertising campaign for the Chevrolet Tahoe and read in the commercial by James Garner.

Works
 Door Number Three (1995)
 The Gift (1998) – nominated for the World Fantasy Award
 Other Voices, Other Doors (collection) (2000)
 The Impossible Bird (2002)
 "The Cane" (2007) Published in Postscripts 12
  The Black Heart (2009)
  "51" (2022)

References

External links
O'Leary's Tumblr page
 "Nobody Knows It But Me" at Everything2
 Excerpts from interview in Locus (September 1999)

1952 births
Living people
20th-century American novelists
21st-century American novelists
American fantasy writers
American male novelists
American science fiction writers
American male short story writers
20th-century American poets
21st-century American poets
American male poets
20th-century American short story writers
21st-century American short story writers
20th-century American male writers
21st-century American male writers